Gabriel Alejandro Vera Jiménez (born 23 August 1999) is a Mexican professional footballer who plays as a defender for Tampico Madero.

Career
Vera's career began with Tercera División de México side Canteranos de Altamira, making his debut in the fourth tier against Bravos on 31 October 2014. Six more appearances came his way during 2014–15 season. In 2015, Vera joined Coyotes de Saltillo. He scored his first senior goal on 10 October, netting in a 7–1 victory over San Isidro Laguna. Another goal in 2015–16 followed versus Correcaminos UAT, a team he made his final Coyotes de Saltillo appearance against on 30 April 2016 in a 9–0 loss. Vera completed a move to fellow Tercera División team Celestes in January 2018. He left the club six months later, having scored five in sixteen matches.

Tampico Madero of Ascenso MX signed Vera in mid 2018. He made his professional debut on 4 September in the Copa MX, featuring for the entirety of a 3–1 defeat to Liga MX's UNAM.

Career statistics
.

Honours
Tampico Madero
 Liga de Expansión MX: Guardianes 2020

References

External links

1999 births
Living people
Footballers from Tamaulipas
Mexican footballers
Association football defenders
Tercera División de México players
Tampico Madero F.C. footballers
People from Ciudad Madero